Nannogomphus is an extinct genus of fossil odonates belonging to the family Gomphidae.

These fast-moving volant carnivore-insectivores lived during the Jurassic period in Germany, from 150.8 to 145.5 Ma.

Species
†Nannogomphus bavaricus Handlirsch 1906
†Nannogomphus buergeri Bechly 2003
†Nannogomphus vetustus Hagen 1848

References

 Redescription of Nannogomphus bavaricus Handlirsch, 1906-1908 from the Upper Jurassic of Germany, with an analysis of its phylogenetic position Odonata, Anisoptera, Gomphidae or Libelluloidea

External links
 Discover Yale Digital Content

Gomphidae
Anisoptera genera
Prehistoric Odonata genera
Jurassic insects
Fossils of Germany
Fossil taxa described in 1906